Trochosa aquatica is a species of wolf spider found in eastern Asia which was first described in 1985.

Description
The males measure 5.8-7.65mm in length, females 5.6-9.0mm. The female has a dark brown carapace with paler more yellow median and lateral stripes. The abdomen is dark grey with yellowish stripes and the legs are reddish brown. The normally smaller male is similar to female but has yellowish brown legs.

Habitat
Trochosa aquatica is found among in leaf litter or in small depressions near paddy fields. The adult spiders are found from May to August.

Distribution
Japan (Honshu and Kyushu), Korea and China.

Taxonomy
Closely related to Trochosa wuchangensis of China.

References

Lycosidae
Fauna of East Asia
Spiders of Asia
Spiders described in 1985